The Güiza River is a river of Colombia. It drains into the Pacific Ocean via the Mira River.

See also
List of rivers of Colombia

References
Rand McNally, The New International Atlas, 1993.

Rivers of Colombia